Martin Haydarov (Bulgarian: Мартин Хайдаров; born 22 January 2003) is a Bulgarian footballer who plays as a forward for CSKA 1948.

Career
Nikolov joined CSKA 1948 coming from the Levski Sofia academy. He made his professional debut for the team in a league match against his youth club Levski Sofia on 28 February 2021.

Career statistics

Club

References

External links
 

2003 births
Living people
Bulgarian footballers
Bulgaria youth international footballers
FC CSKA 1948 Sofia players
First Professional Football League (Bulgaria) players
Association football defenders
Footballers from Plovdiv